Mamiko (written: 麻美子, 眞美子, 真美子, 真宮子 or 麻巳子) is a feminine Japanese given name. Notable people with the name include:

, Japanese idol, singer and actress
, Japanese screenwriter
 Mamiko Oshima-Berger (born 1989), marathon runner from the Northern Mariana Islands
, Japanese voice actress
, Japanese idol and singer

Fictional characters
, a character in the manga series Shadow Star

Japanese feminine given names